My Friend the Polish Girl is a UK/Polish pseudo-documentary drama feature film written, directed, and co-produced by Ewa Banaszkiewicz and Mateusz Dymek. Starring Aneta Piotrowska, Emma Friedman-Cohen, Daniel Barry, Andy Abbot, Darren Rose, and Max Davis, it premiered in competition at the 2018 International Film Festival Rotterdam.

Plot
Katie, a young American documentarian, sets out to make a film about immigrants in post-Brexit-vote London, but ends up intruding on the life of Alicja, a struggling Polish actress. With confrontational questions, she tries to force intimacy and drives a wedge between Alicja and her boyfriend Michael. Alicja earns a pittance as an assistant in a cinema and is trying to get work as an actress while she becomes engrossed in the film. This documentary soon becomes the report of a questionable game in which the two women challenge each other.

Cast 

 Aneta Piotrowska  as Alicja
 Emma Friedman-Cohen  as Katie
 Daniel Barry as Michael
 Andy Abbott as Alex
 Daren Rose as Uncle Mike
 Max Davis as Max

Release
The film had a cinema release in the UK on July 19, 2019 by Republic Distribution  and later on November 29, 2019 in the USA by Subliminal Films.

Reception
Jeannette Catsoulis for  The New York Times wrote, “Shot mostly in black and white and with an improvisational feel, ‘My Friend the Polish Girl’ is cool and clever, feigning social realism with winking calculation.” While Guy Lodge of Variety: “From its cramped, off-the-cuff shooting style (mostly in washed-out monochrome) to its persuasive ensemble, ‘My Friend the Polish Girl’ mostly pulls off the documentary pretense with wily skill.”  Peter Bradshaw from The Guardian nominated the lead Aneta Piotrowska as one of the top female performances of 2019.

Awards
Nominated for Best British Feature Film at the Edinburgh International Film Festival in 2018. My Friend the Polish Girl won the Grand Prix at Mlodzi & Film Debut festival in 2019.

References

External links

2018 films
2010s English-language films